The Scandinavian hydrogen highway partnership is a collaboration started in June 2006 to connect the hydrogen highways  hydrogen link network (Denmark), Hyfuture (Sweden) and Hynor (Norway). 

The planned highway is part of the hydrogen infrastructure, there are several hydrogen re-fueling stations planned along the route.

See also
Hydrogen economy

References

External links
SHHP

Hydrogen economy
Road transport in Denmark
Transport in Sweden
Road transport in Norway